Carlos Ascanio (April 4, 1918 – February 27, 1998) was a baseball player for the New York Black Yankees of the Negro leagues. He played first base and was nicknamed "The Earthquake" due to his powerful swing. Ascanio was the only Venezuelan to play in the Negro leagues, which he joined in 1946 after meeting a pitcher in Cuba, who helped him get a spot in the leagues. After retiring in 1961, he spent a number of years running a sporting goods store in the Venezuelan capital city, Caracas. When petroleum prices began dropping rapidly in the 1980s, the former baseball player was forced to close his business. Then, in February 1998, Ascanio died due to complications from anemia and, ultimately, respiratory failure.

On February 9, 1998, Ascanio was found "destitute and starving" on a sidewalk in downtown Caracas, where he had been living with his wife in a rundown boarding home. The two people that had found him immediately transported Ascanio to the nearest emergency room, where he was diagnosed with severe anemia caused by years of malnutrition.

Just three weeks later, on February 27, Ascanio was pronounced dead due to respiratory failure.

References

External links
 and Seamheads

1918 births
1998 deaths
Baseball first basemen
Cervecería Caracas players
Cienfuegos players
Gavilanes de Maracaibo players
Industriales de Valencia players
Licoreros de Pampero players
New York Black Yankees players
Patriotas de Venezuela players
Sabios de Vargas players
Venezuelan expatriate baseball players in Cuba
Venezuelan expatriate baseball players in the United States
Venezuelan people of indigenous peoples descent
Mestizo people
Deaths from anemia
Deaths from respiratory failure